The following is a timeline of the history of the city of Osaka, Japan.

Prior to 19th century

 211 CE – Sumiyoshi taisha (shrine) founded.
 593 CE – Shitennō-ji (temples) founded.
 645 CE – Capital of Japan relocated to Naniwa-kyō; Kōtoku in power.
 672 – Tenmu in power.
 724 – Shōmu in power.
 794 – Japanese capital relocated from Naniwa to Heian-kyō.
 1496 – Ishiyama Hongan-ji construction begins (approximate date).
 1583 – Osaka Castle construction begins.
 1614 – November: Siege of Osaka begins.
 1615
 June: Siege of Osaka ends.
 Dōtonbori (canal) built.
 1684 – Takemoto-za puppet theatre opens.
 1720 – Sasa-se theatre fan club founded.
 1724 – Kaitokudō merchant academy established.

19th century

 1805 – Bunrakuza puppet theatre opens (approximate date).
 1837 – Economic/social unrest led by Ōshio Heihachirō.
 1838 – Tekijuku (school) opens.
 1868
 European commerce begins.
 City becomes part of Osaka Municipal Prefecture.
 1869 – Tokyo-Osaka steamship line begins operating.
 1871
 Tokyo-Kyoto-Osaka postal service begins.
 Imperial Mint built.
 1874 – Kobe-Osaka railway begins operating; Ōsaka Station (with clocktower) opens.
 1875 – Meiji political Osaka Conference of 1875 held.
 1876 – Osaka Nippō (newspaper) begins publication.
 1878 – Osaka Stock Exchange and   established.
 1879 – Asahi Shimbun (newspaper) begins publication.
 1880 –  established.
 1881 – Osaka Iron Works established.
 1882
 Osaka Boseki Kaisha (spinning mill) in business.
 Population: 332,425.
 1884 – Osaka Shosen Kaisha (shipping firm) in business.
 1887 – Population: 426,846.
 1888 –  (newspaper) begins publication.
 1890 – Nakanoshima Park opens.
 1892
 December 20: Fire.
 Population: 479,895.
 1895
 Sumitomo Bank established.
 Kyōbashi Station built.
 1897
 Demonstration of Lumière "projected pictures" at the Nanchi Embujo theatre.
 Population: 758,285.
 1900 – Population: 881,344 city; 1,678,422 prefecture.

20th century

1900s–1940s
 1901 – Satirical  begins publication.
 1903 –  held in Osaka.
 1904 – Osaka Prefectural Nakanoshima Library opens.
 1905 – Maruki-go bakery in business.
 1909 – Tennōji Park established.
 1910 – Population: 1,239,373 city; 2,197,201 prefecture.
 1915 – Tennōji Zoo founded.
 1917 – City planning committee formed.
 1918
 City Social Bureau established.
  built.
 1919 – Miki Hall (concert venue) opens.
 1920
 Shirokiya department store built.
 Population: 1,768,295.
 1922 – Daimaru department store built.
 1923
 Sharp in business.
  becomes mayor.
 1924 – Osaka Photographic Science Society founded.
 1925
 City wards established: Higashinari, Higashiyodogawa, Konohana, Minato, Naniwa, Nishinari, Nishiyodogawa, Sumiyoshi, and Tennōji.
 "Public radio broadcasting commences."
 Nomura Securities Co., Ltd. established.
 Population: 2,114,804.
 1926 – Asahi Kaikan (concert hall) opens.
 1927 –  (bridge) built over Dojima River.
 1928 – Osaka University of Commerce active.
 1929
 Kosobe Conservatory (garden) established.
 Hankyu Department Store opens in Umeda Station.
 1930 – Population: 2,453,573 city; 3,540,017 prefecture.
 1931 – National Defense Women's Association founded in Osaka.
 1932 – City wards established: Asahi and Taishō.
 1933
 Subway Midōsuji Line begins operating.
 Sanwa Bank established.
 1936
 Osaka Tigers baseball team formed.
  opens.
 1940
 January 28: Train crash at Ajikawaguchi Station.
 Population: 3,252,340 city; 4,843,032 prefecture.
 1942
  (newspaper) in publication.
 Subway Yotsubashi Line begins operating.
 1943
 City wards established: Abeno, Fukushima, Higashisumiyoshi, Ikuno, Jōtō, and Miyakojima.
 Hitachi Zosen Corporation in business.
 1945
 March 13: Bombing of Osaka during World War II begins.
 August 14: Bombing of Osaka ends.
 Population: 1,102,959.
 Osaka Municipal Transportation Bureau established.
 1947
 Kansai Symphony Orchestra founded.
 Population: 1,559,310.
 1948 – Grand Sumo tournament begins.
 1949 – Osaka City University and Osaka Securities Exchange active.

1950s–1990s
 1950 – Population: 1,956,136.
 1955
 Cinerama Gekijo opens.
 Sankei Sports newspaper begins publication.
 Population: 2,547,321.
 1956
 Tsūtenkaku (tower) built.
 Osaka designated a government ordinance city.
 1957 – Sister city relationship established with San Francisco, USA.
 1958 – Radio Osaka begins broadcasting.
 1961
 September: Typhoon Muroto II occurs.
 Subway Chūō Line begins operating.
 1964
 Tokyo-Osaka Tōkaidō Shinkansen (hi-speed train) begins operating.
 Nagai Stadium opens.
 1967 – Subway Tanimachi Line begins operating.
 1968 –  newspaper in publication.
 1969 – Subway Sakaisuji Line and Sennichimae Line begin operating.
 1970
 April: Gas explosion in Kita-ku.
 Expo '70 (world's fair) held in Osaka.
 1972
 May 13: Sennichi Department Store Building fire.
 Osaka Expo '70 Stadium opens.
 1974 – City wards established: Hirano, Suminoe, Tsurumi, and Yodogawa.
 1975 – Population: 2,780,000.
 1977 – National Museum of Art, Osaka opens.
 1979 – Capsule Inn Osaka in business.
 1980 –  established.
 1982
 Osaka International Ladies Marathon begins.
 Museum of Oriental Ceramics, Osaka established.
 1983 – Osaka-jō Hall (arena) opens.
 1984 – National Bunraku Theatre opens.
 1987 – Kincho Stadium opens.
 1989
 City wards established: Chūō and Kita.
 Osaka Science Museum opens.
 1990
 Subway Nagahori Tsurumi-ryokuchi Line begins operating.
 Osaka Aquarium Kaiyukan opens.
 Garden and Greenery Exposition held in city.
 1993 – Umeda Sky Building constructed.
 1995
 January 17: The 6.9  Great Hanshin earthquake shakes the southern Hyōgo Prefecture with a maximum Shindo of VII, leaving 5,502–6,434 people dead, and 251,301–310,000 displaced in the region.
 Takafumi Isomura becomes mayor.
 1996 – Osaka Prefectural Central Library opens.
 1997 – Tempozan Ferris Wheel and Kyocera Dome open.
 1999 – Momofuku Ando Instant Ramen Museum opens in nearby Ikeda.

21st century
 2001 – June 8: Osaka school massacre occurs in nearby Ikeda.
 2006 – Subway Imazatosuji Line begins operating.
 2007 – Kunio Hiramatsu becomes mayor.
 2009 – Kansai Music Conference begins.
 2010 – Population: 2,665,314.
 2011 – Tōru Hashimoto becomes mayor.
 2013 – Festival Hall opens.
 2014 – Population: 2,685,218.
 2021 – December 17: A fire occurs in Kita ward.

See also
 Osaka history
 Osaka history (in Japanese; includes timeline)

References

This article incorporates information from the Japanese Wikipedia.

Bibliography

Published in the 19th century
 

Published in the 20th century
 
 
 
 
 
 
 
 
 
 
 
 
 
 
 
 

Published in the 21st century
 
 
 
 
  (first published in 1987)

External links

 Items related to Osaka, various dates (via Europeana). 
 Items related to Osaka, various dates (via Digital Public Library of America).

Osaka
History of Osaka Prefecture
Osaka
Years in Japan
Osaka